Indian Institute of Space Science and Technology (IIST) is a government-aided institute and deemed university for the study and research of space science, located at Valiamala, Nedumangad,
Thiruvananthapuram, Kerala. It is the first university in Asia to be solely dedicated to the study and research of Outer space. It was inaugurated on 14 September 2007 by G. Madhavan Nair, the then Chairman of ISRO. IIST was set up by the Indian Space Research Organisation (ISRO) under the Department of Space, Government of India. A. P. J. Abdul Kalam, former President of India, was the Chancellor of IIST.
IIST offers regular engineering undergraduate, postgraduate and doctorate programmes with focus on space science, technology and applications.

History
It is the only institute of its kind in India, which offers a BTech degree in Space Technology, and subjects exclusive to the arena of space science and technology. B. N. Suresh, former director of Vikram Sarabhai Space Centre, is the founding director of the institute.

On 14 July 2008, the Union Human Resource Development Ministry, on the advice of the University Grants Commission (UGC), conferred deemed university status, under a new category, to the institute for a period of five years.

Campus
At its inception, the institute started functioning at the ATF Campus, under Vikram Sarabhai Space Centre, Thiruvananthapuram (Trivandrum), Kerala. Modern environmentally friendly buildings of unique architecture merge well with the thickly wooded campus of 100 acres situated on the foothills of Sahyadri.

A state-of-the-art residential campus built near Liquid Propulsion Systems Centre in Valiamala, Nedumangad, Thiruvananthapuram was inaugurated by Dr. Manmohan Singh, the then Prime Minister of India on 25 August 2009. The institute started functioning in its new campus from 15 August 2010. The campus has an extension in the picturesque Ponmudi Hills, Thiruvananthapuram, for an observatory.

Academics
IIST offers undergraduate (BTech), master's (MTech) and PhD programs in space science and technology, and also serves as a research centre. Doctoral programs in basic sciences and post-doctoral programs are also offered. Till 2013 batch, three different courses in BTech were offered, namely BTech in Aerospace, Avionics and Physical Sciences. As of 2014 admissions, a new 5-year Dual Degree (BTech + MTech/M.S) in Engineering Physics replaced the existing Physical Sciences branch. The MTech/M.S can be done in any of the following – M.S. in Astronomy & Astrophysics, MTech in Earth System Science, MTech in Machine Learning and Computing, MTech in Geoinformatics, MTech in Aerodynamics & Flight Mechanics, MTech in Structures and Design, MTech in Thermal and Propulsion, MTech in Control Systems, MTech in Digital Signal Processing, MTech in RF and Microwave Engineering, MTech in Power Electronics, MTech in VLSI and Microsystems, MTech in Material Science and Technology, MTech in Solid State Physics and MTech in Optical Engineering. The seats are limited to 20 in the dual degree program from the existing 36 in Physical Sciences. 60 students each are admitted to the Aerospace and Avionics branches.

Admissions

The admissions to the undergraduate (BTech) programmes for 2013 to 2016 were made through the All India Rank List prepared and published by the Central Board of Secondary Education (CBSE), based on the Joint Entrance Examination (JEE) – Main. Previously, IIST admitted students through the IIT-JEE rank lists from 2007 to 2009, and conducted its own entrance exam called ISAT from 2010 to 2012. However, applicants will need to qualify the JEE Advanced exam, and marks obtained in the same will be used in determining the eligibility of the candidate IIST offers 140 seats for admission to its B.Tech. programmes in aerospace engineering, avionics and engineering physics. The BTech branch of physical sciences was replaced with a dual-degree (BTech and MTech) engineering physics branch starting from the batch which joined in 2014. Over 100,000 aspirants applied for these seats in ISAT 2012 making IIST one of the most selective institutes in India. From 2017 onwards, the admissions are based on JEE Advanced scores.

The applications for admission to MTech courses are invited directly and students are shortlisted based on undergraduate academic performance, GATE score, interview and projects undertaken by them.

Departments

Science
 Department of Mathematics
 Department of Physics
 Department of Chemistry
 Department of Earth and Space sciences

Technology
 Department of Aerospace Engineering
 Department of Avionics

Humanities
 Department of Humanities

Rankings

Indian Institute of Space Science and Technology was ranked 43rd by the National Institutional Ranking Framework (NIRF) engineering category 2020.

Observatory
IIST also has a small observatory on campus equipped with an 8-inch Newtonian telescope. A 14-inch telescope will replace the 8-inch telescope in the near future. The telescope is housed in a dome on top of the Science academic block. The dome is powered by two sets of solar panels.

Student activities

Student projects
VYOM ('sky' in Sanskrit) is the Sounding Rocket designed by the BTech students of IIST. Vyom had its maiden flight on 11 May 2012 when it took to the sky from TERLS. and the mission was a total success. The objective of the launch was to flight-test the solid rocket motor and the accelerometer payload developed for the project. Vyom is the first student made sounding rocket in Asia and the Vyom Mk II was planned for launch in 2015.
IIST also runs a student satellite project, which is also slated for launch in 2014–2015 on board the PSLV.

Student festivals
The following student festivals are organised at IIST every year.

Conscientia
Conscientia is the Annual Astronomy and Technology Festival of IIST. Conscientia offers various challenging events in different fields of engineering and science, including astronomy, aerospace engineering, electronics, computer science, mechanical engineering, robotics, etc. In the year 2010, the astronomy festival Aparimit has been incorporated into Conscientia.
The 2010 edition was inaugurated by IIST's Chancellor, A. P. J. Abdul Kalam, former President of India.
In just a few years, Conscientia has evolved to become the largest technical festival in the state of Kerala. The 2014 edition of the festival is going to start on 28 February 2014. The official website of the festival

Dhanak
Dhanak is the Annual Cultural Festival of IIST. Named after the Urdu word for 'rainbow', it stands for the splash of colour and sunshine that this festival brings with it. It spans all facets of cultural activity, including dramatics, fine arts, literature, quizzing, music, dance, film-making, and photography. The most awaited moment at Dhanak is the pronite, in which a DJ/Band is invited to perform. Dhanak 2015 witnessed DJ VH1 Supersonic. Progressive Brothers from DJ Sunburn gave their performance in 2016 and Masala Coffee, South India's largest band performed in Dhanak in 2017. Dhanak also features themes every year based on which the whole campus is decorated. The theme for 2018 was "comicolours".

IIST Model United Nations (IIST MUN)
Started as an intra-college event in March 2012, IIST MUN has now become a national inter-college Model United Nations with United Nations General Assembly council held successfully in September 2012, 2013, October 2014 and April 2015. It has become an annual event, with the 2019 event to be held in April.

International collaborations
IIST has signed a number of memorandums of understanding (MoUs) with international universities and Institutions for joint research, and exchange of students and faculty. These include Caltech-USA, Jet Propulsion Laboratory-USA, University of Colorado, Boulder-USA, Technion-Israel, University of Cambridge-UK and Nanyang Technological University-Singapore. A number of other collaborations are under discussions. The Satish Dhawan fellowship at California Institute of Technology was announced by Dr. K. Radhakrishnan, Chairman, ISRO on 3 June 2013. The fellowship provides an opportunity every year starting from the winter session of the academic year 2013–14 to one meritorious graduating student from the Aerospace Department of IIST to be sponsored by the Department of Space, Government of India to pursue master's degree in aerospace engineering at the California Institute of Technology.

See also
 List of engineering colleges in Kerala
 List of universities in India
 List of autonomous higher education institutes in India
 Department of Space (India)
 Indian Space Research Organisation
 Indian Institutes of Technology
 Indian Institute of Science
 Indian Institute of Astrophysics
National Institutes of Technology

References

External links

 

Space technology research institutes
Aerospace engineering organizations
Space programme of India
Indian Space Research Organisation facilities
Deemed universities in India
Science and technology in Kerala
Universities in Kerala
Colleges in Thiruvananthapuram
Research institutes in Thiruvananthapuram
Educational institutions established in 2007
2007 establishments in Kerala
Research institutes established in 2007